The Jhelum River (/dʒʰeːləm/) is a river in the northern Indian subcontinent. It originates at Verinag and flows through the Indian-administered territory of Jammu and Kashmir, into the Pakistani-administered territory of Kashmir, then the Pakistani province of Punjab. It is the westernmost of the five rivers of the Punjab region, and flows through the Kashmir Valley.

Etymology

, a Pakistani author, recorded some stories of the name Jhelum in his book Tareekh-e-Jhelum as:Many writers have different opinions about the name of Jhelum. One suggestion is that in ancient days Jhelumabad was known as Jalham. The word Jhelum is reportedly derived from the words Jal (pure water) and Ham (snow). The name thus refers to the waters of a river (flowing beside the city) which have their origins in the snow-capped Himalayas.

The Sanskrit name for the river is Vitástā, derived from an apocryphal legend regarding the origin of the river in the Nilamata Purana. The name survives in the Kashmiri name for this river, Vyath.

History

The river Jhelum was called Hydaspes by the ancient Greeks. 

Alexander the Great and his army crossed the Jhelum in BC 326 at the Battle of the Hydaspes River, where he defeated an Indian king, Porus. According to Arrian (Anabasis, 29), he built a city "on the spot whence he started to cross the river Hydaspes", which he named Bukephala (or Bucephala) to honour his famous horse Bucephalus, buried in Jalalpur Sharif. It is thought that ancient Bukephala was near the site of modern Jhelum. According to Gujrat district historian Mansoor Behzad Butt, Bukephalus was buried in Jalalpur Sharif, but the people of Mandi Bahauddin, a district close to Jehlum, believed that their tehsil Phalia was named after Alexander's dead horse, saying that the name Phalia was a distortion of Bucephala. 

The waters of the Jhelum are allocated to Pakistan under the terms of the Indus Waters Treaty. India is working on a hydropower project on a tributary of Jhelum river to establish first-use rights on the river water over Pakistan as per the Indus Waters Treaty.

Mythology

The ancient Greeks regarded the river as a god, as they did most mountains and streams. The poet Nonnus in the Dionysiaca calls the Hydaspes a titan-descended god, the son of the sea-god Thaumas and the cloud-goddess Elektra, the brother of Iris, goddess of the rainbow, and half-brother to the harpies, the snatching winds. Since the river is in a foreign country, it is not clear whether they named the river after the god, or whether the god Hydaspes was named after the river.
According to the Nilmata Purana, Hindu goddess Parvati was requested by the sage Kasyapa to come to Kashmir to purify the land from the evil practices and impurities of the Pisachas living there. Parvati then assumed the form of a river in the netherworld. Then Lord Shiva struck with his spear near the abode of Nila, (Verinag spring). With that stroke of the spear, Parvati came out of the netherworld. Shiva himself named her Vitasta. He had excavated with the spear a ditch measuring one vitasti, through which the river, gone to the netherworld,  came out, so he gave her the name Vitástā.

Course
The river Jhelum rises from Verinag spring at the foot of the Pir Panjal in the southeastern Kashmir Valley administered by India. It is joined by its tributaries 
Lidder River near village Mirgund at Khanabal 
Veshaw River at Sangam in Anantnag 
Sind River at Shadipora
Pohru River at Doabgah in Sopore, Jammu and Kashmir. 
It flows through Srinagar and Wular Lake before entering Pakistan-administered Kashmir through a deep narrow gorge. The Neelum River, the largest tributary of the Jhelum, joins it at Domel, Muzaffarabad, as does the next largest, the Kunhar River of Kaghan Valley. It is then joined by the Poonch River, and flows into the Mangla Dam reservoir in the Mirpur District. The Jhelum enters Pakistani Punjab in the Jhelum District. From there, it flows through the plains of Pakistan's Punjab, forming the boundary between the Jech and Sindh Sagar Doabs. It ends in a confluence with the Chenab River at Trimmu in the Jhang District. The Chenab merges with the Sutlej to form the Panjnad River, which joins the Indus River at Mithankot.

Most of the villages and important cities of Kashmir valley are situated on the banks of Jhelum.

Lakes

Dams and barrages
The river has rich power generation potential in India. Water control structures are being built as a result of the Indus Basin Project, including the following:
 Mangla Dam, completed in 1967, is one of the largest earth-fill dams in the world, with a storage capacity of 
 Karot Hydropower Project is an under-construction concrete-core rockfill gravity large dam in Pakistan, with a planned installed capacity of 720 MW.
 Rasul Barrage, constructed in 1967, has a maximum flow of 850,000 ft³/s (24,000 m³/s).
 Trimmu Barrage, constructed in 1939 some 20 km from Jhang Sadar at the confluence with the Chenab, has maximum discharge capacity of 645,000 ft³/s (18,000 m³/s).
 Haranpur (Victoria Bridge) Constructed in 1933 Approximate 5 km from Malakwal near Chak Nizam village. Its length is 1 km, mainly used by Pakistan Railways, but there is a passage for light vehicles, motorcycles, cycles and pedestrians on one side.
 Uri Dam with 480 MW Hydroelectric station is located in Baramulla district of Jammu and Kashmir.
Uri Dam II with 240 MW HYdro electric station is also located in Baramulla district of Jammu and Kashmir.
 Kishanganga Hydroelectric Plant with 330 MW Hydroelectric station is located in Bandipora district of Jammu and Kashmir.

Canals
 Canals in and around the city of Srinagar.
 The Upper Jhelum Canal runs from Mangla Dam to the Chenab.
 The Rasul-Qadirabad Link Canal (Pakistan)|Chashma]]-Jhelum Link Canal runs from the Chashma Barrage on the Indus River to the Jhelum river downstream of Rasul Barrage.

Gallery

See also

Notes

References

External links

 Livius.org pictures of the Hydaspes 

Potamoi
Rivers of India
Rivers of Pakistan
Rivers of Azad Kashmir
Rivers of Jammu and Kashmir
Tributaries of the Indus River
International rivers of Asia
Jhelum
Jhelum District
Rigvedic rivers
Rivers in Buddhism
Rivers of Punjab (Pakistan)

pa:ਜੇਹਲਮ